The Honda Point disaster was the largest peacetime loss of U.S. Navy ships.  On the evening of September 8, 1923, seven destroyers, while traveling at 20 knots (37 km/h), ran aground at Honda Point (also known as Point Pedernales; the cliffs just off-shore called Devil's Jaw), a few miles from the northern side of the Santa Barbara Channel off Point Arguello on the Gaviota Coast in Santa Barbara County, California. Two other ships grounded, but were able to maneuver free off the rocks.  Twenty-three sailors died in the disaster.

Geography of Honda Point

The area of Honda Point is extremely treacherous for central California mariners, as it features a series of rocky outcroppings, collectively known as Woodbury Rocks  (one of which is today named Destroyer Rock on navigational charts). Called the Devil's Jaw, the area has been a navigational hazard since the Spanish explorers first came in the 16th century. It is just north of the entrance to the Santa Barbara Channel, which was the intended route of the destroyers involved in the disaster.

Honda Point today

Honda Point, also called Point Pedernales, is located on the seacoast at Vandenberg Space Force Base, near the city of Lompoc, California. There is a plaque and a memorial to the disaster at the site. The memorial includes a ship's bell from Chauncey. A propeller and a propeller shaft from Delphy is on display outside the Veterans' Memorial Building, in Lompoc, California.

Incident
The fourteen ships of Destroyer Squadron Eleven (DesRon 11) were steaming south in column from San Francisco Bay to San Diego Bay on September 8, 1923. All were s, less than five years old.

The ships turned east to course 095, supposedly heading into the Santa Barbara Channel, at 21:00.  The ships were navigating by dead reckoning, estimating positions from their course and speed, as measured by propeller revolutions per minute. At that time radio navigation aids were new and not completely trusted. 

USS Delphy was equipped with a radio navigation receiver, but her captain, Lieutenant Commander Donald T. Hunter, who was also acting as the squadron's navigator, ignored its indicated bearings, believing them to be erroneous. No effort was made to take soundings of water depths using a fathometer as this would require the ships to slow down to take the measurements.

The ships were performing an exercise that simulated wartime conditions, and Captain Watson also wanted the squadron to make a fast passage to San Diego, so the decision was made not to slow down. Despite the heavy fog, Commodore Watson ordered all ships to travel in close formation and, turning too soon, went aground. Six others followed and sank. Two ships whose captains disobeyed the close-formation order survived, although they also hit the rocks.

Earlier the same day, the mail steamship  ran aground nearby. Some attributed these incidents in the Santa Barbara Channel to unusual currents caused by the great Tokyo earthquake of the previous week.

Ships involved
 

 

The lost ships were:
  (DD-261), the flagship in the column. After running aground, she sounded her siren. The siren alerted some of the later ships in the column, helping them avoid the tragedy. Three of her crew died. Eugene Dooman, a State Department expert on Japan, who survived, was aboard as a guest of Captain Watson, whom he had met in Japan.
  (DD-310) was following a few hundred yards behind. She saw the Delphy suddenly stop, and turned to port (left) in response. As a result, she ran aground on the coast.
  (DD-312) made no move to turn. She tore her hull open on submerged rocks, and the inrush of water capsized her onto her starboard side. Twenty men died.
  (DD-309) turned to starboard, but struck an offshore rock.
  (DD-311) turned to port and also hit a rock.
  (DD-297) stuck next to Woodbury.
  (DD-296) ran aground while attempting to rescue sailors from the capsized Young.

Light damage was recorded by:
  (DD-300) ran aground, but was able to extricate herself and was not lost.
  (DD-301) was lightly damaged.

The remaining five ships avoided the rocks:
  (DD-298)
  (DD-306)
  (DD-307)
  (DD-302)
  (DD-305)

Rescue efforts
Rescue attempts promptly followed the accident. Local ranchers, who were alerted by the commotion of the disaster, rigged up breeches buoys from the surrounding clifftops and lowered them down to the ships that had run aground. Fishermen nearby who had seen the tragedy picked up members of the crew from USS Fuller and USS Woodbury. 

The surviving members of the crew of the capsized Young were able to climb to safety on the nearby USS Chauncey via a lifeline. The five destroyers in Destroyer Squadron Eleven which avoided running aground at Honda Point were also able to contribute to rescue efforts by picking up sailors who had been thrown into the water and by assisting those who were stuck aboard the wreckage of other ships. 

After the disaster, the government did not attempt to salvage any of the wrecks at Honda Point due to the nature of the damage each ship sustained. The wrecks themselves, along with the equipment that remained on them, were sold to a scrap merchant for a total of $1,035.  The wrecked ships were still not moved by late , since they may be clearly seen in film footage taken from the German airship Graf Zeppelin as she headed towards Los Angeles on her circumnavigation of the globe; the film footage is used in the documentary film Farewell (2009).

Court martial

The  seven-officer Navy court-martial board, presided over by Vice Admiral Henry A. Wiley, commander battleship divisions of the Battle Fleet,  ruled that the disaster was the fault of the fleet commander and the flagship's navigators. They assigned blame to the captain of each ship that ran aground, following the tradition that a captain's first responsibility is to his own ship, even when in formation. Eleven officers involved were brought before general courts-martial on the charges of negligence and culpable inefficiency to perform one's duty. This was the largest single group of officers ever court-martialed in the U.S. Navy's history. 

The court martial ruled that the events of the Honda Point Disaster were "directly attributable to bad errors and faulty navigation" by Captain Watson. Watson was stripped of his seniority, and three other officers were admonished. 

Those officers who were court-martialed were all acquitted. 

Captain Watson, who had been defended by Admiral Thomas Tingey Craven, was commended by his peers and the government for assuming full responsibility for the disaster at Honda Point. He could have tried to blame a variety of factors for the disaster, but instead, he set an example for those others by accepting the responsibility entirely on his shoulders.  

A Court of Inquiry recommended Cmdr. Roper for a Letter of Commendation for turning his division away from danger.

Captain Edward Howe Watson

Captain Edward H. Watson, an 1895 graduate of the United States Naval Academy, commanded Destroyer Squadron Eleven (DesRon 11). He had served during the Spanish–American War, the Philippine Insurrection, and World War I. Watson was promoted to captain in 1917. Assigned as commodore of DesRon 11 in July 1922, it was his first time as a unit commander.

Navigational errors
The fourteen Clemson-class destroyers of Destroyer Squadron Eleven were to follow the flagship USS Delphy in column formation from San Francisco Bay, through the Santa Barbara Channel, and finally to San Diego. Destroyer Squadron Eleven was on a twenty-four-hour exercise from northern California to southern California. The flagship was responsible for  navigation. As the Delphy steamed along the coastline, poor visibility meant the navigators had to go by the age-old technique of dead reckoning. They had to estimate their position based on their speed and heading. The captain of the Delphy was also acting as the squadron's navigator, overriding his ship's navigator, Lieutenant (junior grade) Lawrence Blodgett.  The Delphy did have radio direction finding (RDF) equipment, which picked up signals from a station at Point Arguello, but RDF was new and the bearings obtained were dismissed by Hunter as unreliable. Based solely on dead reckoning, Captain Watson ordered the fleet to turn east into the Santa Barbara Channel. However, the Delphy was actually several miles northeast of where they thought they were, and the error caused the ships to run aground on Honda Point.

The Kennedy intercepted radio bearings to the Delphy and to the Stoddert, and accurately determined the fleet's position.  When the Kennedy reached the turning point, Commander Walter G. Roper, in charge of Division 32 (Kennedy, Paul Hamilton, Stoddert, and Thompson) at the rear of the column, ordered his ships to slow down and then to stop, and avoided running aground.

Ocean conditions
At his court martial, LCdr. Hunter, the navigator of the Delphy, testified. "I think there is also a possibility that abnormal currents caused by the Japanese earthquake might have been another contributory cause, or magnetic disturbances connected with the solar eclipse affected the compassbut of these I cannot, of course, speak with any first hand knowledge." On September 1, 1923, seven days before the disaster, the Great Kantō earthquake had occurred in Japan. Unusually large swells and strong currents arose off the coast of California and remained for a number of days. Before Destroyer Squadron Eleven even reached Honda Point, a number of ships had encountered navigational problems as a result of unusual currents.

As DesRon 11 began their exercise run down the California coast, they made their way through these swells and currents. While the squadron was traveling through these swells and currents, their estimations of speed and bearing used for dead reckoning were being affected. The navigators aboard the lead ship Delphy did not take into account the effects of the strong currents and large swells in their estimations. Consequently, the entire squadron was off course and positioned near the treacherous coastline of Honda Point instead of the open ocean of the Santa Barbara Channel. Coupled with darkness and thick fog, the swells and currents attributed to the earthquake in Japan made accurate navigation by dead reckoning nearly impossible for the Delphy. The geography of Honda Point, which is completely exposed to wind and waves, created a deadly environment once the unusually strong swells and currents were added to the coastline.

Once the error in navigation occurred, the weather conditions and ocean conditions sealed the fate of the squadron. The weather surrounding Honda Point at the time of the disaster was windy and foggy while the geography of the area created strong counter-currents and swells that forced the ships into the rocks once they entered the area.

See also
Point Arguello Light
Point Conception Light
Scilly naval disaster of 1707

References

Further reading
 Michael Corbin Ray & Therese Vannier Dead Reckoning (2020)
 Anthony Preston Destroyers (1998)
 Elwyn Overshiner Course 095 To Eternity (1980)
 Charles Hice The Last Hours Of Seven Four-Stackers (1967)

External links

 
 
 Haze Gray and Underway's page on the disaster
 
 

1923 in California
1923 disasters in the United States

History of Santa Barbara County, California
History of the United States Navy
Maritime history of California
Maritime incidents in 1923
Non-combat naval accidents
Shipwrecks of the California coast
Events that led to courts-martial
Ship grounding